John Pettit (June 24, 1807January 17, 1877) was an American lawyer, jurist, and politician. A United States Representative and Senator from Indiana, he also served in the court systems of Indiana and Kansas.

Born in Sackets Harbor, New York, he completed preparatory studies and admitted to the bar in 1831. He moved to Lafayette, Indiana, where he commenced practice in 1838; he was a member of the Indiana House of Representatives in 1838-1839 and was United States district attorney from 1839 to 1843.

Pettit was elected as a Democrat to the Twenty-eighth, Twenty-ninth, and Thirtieth Congresses (March 4, 1843 - March 3, 1849); he was an unsuccessful candidate for renomination in 1848. In 1850 he was a delegate to the Indiana state constitutional convention and a presidential elector on the Democratic ticket in 1852. He was appointed to the U.S. Senate to fill the vacancy caused by the death of James Whitcomb and served from January 18, 1853, to March 4, 1855; he was an unsuccessful candidate for reelection in 1854.

While in the Senate he was chairman of the Committee on Private Land Claims (Thirty-third Congress). During the Senate debate on the Kansas-Nebraska Act of 1854, Pettit argued in favor of expanding slavery to Kansas, and famously said that Jefferson's idea (in the United States Declaration of Independence) that "all men are created equal" was not a "self-evident truth" but instead "is nothing more to me than a self-evident lie." The debate over Pettit's inflammatory words is credited with reviving Abraham Lincoln's interest in national politics.

After his time in Congress, Pettit was chief justice of the United States courts in the Territory of Kansas from 1859 to 1861, and was a judge of the Indiana Supreme Court from 1870 to 1877.

He died in Lafayette, Indiana, aged 69, and was interred in Greenbush Cemetery.

References

External links 

 
Text of 1854 speech by Abraham Lincoln against the extension of slavery, quoting Pettit

 

Kansas Territory judges
Democratic Party members of the United States House of Representatives from Indiana
Justices of the Indiana Supreme Court
Democratic Party members of the Indiana House of Representatives
People from Sackets Harbor, New York
1807 births
1877 deaths
American proslavery activists
Union College (New York) alumni
Delegates to the 1851 Indiana constitutional convention
Democratic Party United States senators from Indiana
United States Attorneys for the District of Indiana
19th-century American politicians
American white supremacists
19th-century American judges